This table displays the top-rated primetime television series of the 1977–78 season as measured by Nielsen Media Research.

References

1977 in American television
1978 in American television
1977-related lists
1978-related lists
Lists of American television series